Arbanitis mudfordae is a spiny trapdoor spider in the Idiopidae family, which is found in New South Wales.

It was first described by Graham Wishart and David Rowell in 2008 as Misgolas mudfordae, In 2015, genera boundaries in the Mygalomorphae were redefined by Rix and others, defining the new genus Arbanitis, and giving the new species name, Arbanitis mudfordae.

References 

Spiders described in 2008
Idiopidae
Spiders of Australia